Iron(II) iodide is an inorganic compound with the chemical formula FeI2.  It is used as a catalyst in organic reactions.

Preparation 
Iron(II) iodide can be synthesised from the elements, i.e. by the reaction of iron with iodine.
Fe + I2 → FeI2

This is in contrast to the other iron(II) halides, which are best prepared by reaction of heated iron with the appropriate hydrohalic acid.
Fe + 2HX → FeX2 + H2

In contrast to the ferrous fluoride, chloride and bromide, which form known hydrates, the diiodide is speculated to form a stable tetrahydrate but it not been characterized directly.

Structure 
Iron(II) iodide adopts the same crystal structure as cadmium iodide (CdI2).

Reactions 
Iron(II) iodide dissolves in water. Dissolving iron metal in hydroiodic acid is another route to aqueous solutions of iron(II) iodide. Crystalline hydrates precipitate from these solutions.

See also 
 Iron(III) iodide, FeI3, unstable

References

Iron(II) compounds
Iodides
Antianemic preparations